The Cinnamon Grand Colombo, trading as Asian Hotels and Properties PLC and formerly called the Hotel Lanka Oberoi, is a luxury five-star hotel in Colombo, Sri Lanka. The Cinnamon Grand is located at 77 Galle Road, Kollupitiya, Colombo.

History 

The construction of Hotel Lanka Oberoi began in 1973. The hotel commenced operations in 1975. It was the first hotel located outside India of Oberoi Hotels. The hotel was constructed on the land where the Bishop of Church of Ceylon resided until the 1970s. The atrium of the hotel was designed by Skidmore, Owings & Merrill. Until then, only Hyatt Regency Atlanta had such an architectural feature.

On 28 January 1984, a bomb exploded in the hotel, then called the Hotel Lanka Oberoi. One employee was killed. The operators of the hotel, Oberoi Hotels agreed with Asian Hotels, the owner of the hotel, to terminate the management agreement in 2003. The hotel was relaunched as Colombo Plaza Hotel after that. In the same year, John Keells Holdings acquired a controlling stake of 60.5 per cent of Asian Hotels Ltd for LKR4.1 billion. John Keells Holdings rebranded the hotel as Cinnamon Grand in 2005.

2019 Easter bombings

It was one of the sites targeted in a coordinated string of terrorist bombings that occurred on Easter. Raadhika Sarathkumar, a popular Sri Lankan born Indian Tamil actress narrowly escaped from a bomb explosion which happened at Cinnamon Grand Hotel where she was present after wrapping up shooting for a film.

Amenities
The hotel houses seven restaurants and two bars. These include the Lagoon, a seafood restaurant; Noodles, an Asian restaurant; Nuga Gama, a Sri Lankan restaurant; Tao, an Asian fusion cuisine restaurant; London Grill, a steakhouse; Chutney, a South Indian restaurant; and Cheers Pub. Other amenities include, two gyms, two pools, one outside, one on the rooftop; and saunas.

See also
 List of hotels in Sri Lanka

References 

Hotels in Colombo
Apartment buildings in Colombo
Companies listed on the Colombo Stock Exchange
2019 Sri Lanka Easter bombings
Hotels established in 1975
Hotel buildings completed in 1975